The 2018–19 Premier League of Bosnia and Herzegovina, known as Liga 12 and also known as BH Telecom Premier League for sponsorship reasons, was the nineteenth season of the Premier League of Bosnia and Herzegovina, the highest football league of Bosnia and Herzegovina. The season began on 21 July 2018 and concluded on 25 May 2019, with a winter break between early December 2018 and late February 2019.

Teams
A total of 12 teams contested in the league, including 10 sides from the 2017–18 season and two promoted from each of the second-level league.

Stadiums and locations

Personnel and kits

Note: Flags indicate national team as has been defined under FIFA eligibility rules. Players and Managers may hold more than one non-FIFA nationality.

League table

Positions by table

The table lists the positions of teams after each week of matches. In order to preserve chronological evolvements, any postponed matches are not included to the round at which they were originally scheduled, but added to the full round they were played immediately afterwards.

Results

Rounds 1–22

Rounds 23–33

Top goalscorers

References

External links

2018-19
Bosnia
1